The 2002–03 season was Sepahan's 2nd season in the Pro League, their 20th consecutive season in the top division of Iranian Football and 49th year in existence as a football club. They competed in the Hazfi Cup.

Matches

Pro league

League table

Hazfi Cup

Bracket

References

External links
  Club Official Website
  The Club page in Soccerway.com
  The Club page in Persianleague.com

 
Sepahan